Stonebriar Community Church is a nondenominational evangelical megachurch in Frisco, Texas, a northern suburb of Dallas, Texas. The church was founded in 1998 by a group of individuals including Senior Pastor Chuck Swindoll, whose sermons are broadcast worldwide on the radio program Insight for Living.

History 
Within six months of its 1998 founding, 1,500 people were attending Sunday worship services at Stonebriar’s temporary location, the Preston Ridge campus of Collin College. In 2001, the church opened the doors of a new  building. By 2005, Sunday attendance was averaging 4,000 adults and 1,200 children, prompting the church to begin planning another building expansion.

In 2002, Stonebriar Community Church identified Chhattisgarh, a state in central India, as its strategic missions focus. The church’s goal is to train 1,000 national pastors, build 1,000 churches, and see 500,000 people become Christians in 10 years. By 2006, 280 men and women had earned theology diplomas, and 230 national pastors were leading 750 churches and home groups with a total of 20,000 members.

Construction of a new worship center was completed in the fall of 2008, making room for 3,000 people at each worship service.

References

External links
 Stonebriar Community Church

Evangelical churches in Texas
Churches in the Dallas–Fort Worth metroplex
Evangelical megachurches in the United States
Megachurches in Texas
Christian organizations established in 1998